The 2019 America East Conference women's soccer tournament was the postseason women's soccer tournament for the America East Conference held from November 3 through November 10, 2019. The five-match tournament took place at campus sites, with the higher seed hosting. The six-team single-elimination tournament consisted of three rounds based on seeding from regular season conference play. The defending champions were the Albany Great Danes, who were unable to defend their title after losing in the Quarterfinals to Hartford. Stony Brook won their second tournament in three years after a 2–1 victory in the final.  It was the first victory for first year head coach Tobias Bischof.

Bracket

Schedule

Quarterfinals

Semifinals

Final

Statistics

Goalscorers 
3 Goals
 Erin O'Connor (Stony Brook)

2 Goals
 Kaylan Williams (New Hampshire)

1 Goal
 Bridgette Alexander (Hartford)
 Julie Cane (New Hampshire)
 Meghan Cavanaugh (Albany)
 Fanny Gotesson (Stony Brook)
 Victor Jedrychowski (Hartford)
 Olivia McKnight (Binghamton)
 Leah Pais (Albany)
 Ally Renyolds (New Hampshire)
 Molly Socha (Hartford)
 Sierra Stone (Hartford)
 Erin Theiller (Binghamton)
 Skylar Vitiello (Hartford)

Source:

MVP in bold

References 

 
America East Conference Women's Soccer Tournament